Abaca bract mosaic virus (ABrMV) is a plant pathogenic virus of the family Potyviridae.  Attempts have been made to sequence ABrMV.

The virus is said to be a significant pathogen of the abaca, along with the Abaca bunchy top virus.

Banana bract mosaic virus also infects the abaca, but it is unknown whether the two viruses are related. Another source describes the main viral pathogens of the abaca as the banana bract mosaic virus and the sugarcane mosaic virus, without mentioning this name at all.

References

Viral plant pathogens and diseases
Potyviruses